Deledio is a surname. Notable people with the surname include:

 Brett Deledio (born 1987), Australian rules footballer
 Wayne Deledio (born 1955), Australian rules footballer, father of Brett